Gary Stadler is an American new-age pianist, composer, songwriter and producer, specializing in contemporary Celtic-influenced themes and atmospheres. Stadler's six albums generally focus on imaginative concepts loosely based in Celtic mythology, especially stories of the realm of Faerie.  His music combines melodic elements of rare world instruments, mastery of synthesizer orchestrations and studio techniques. Three of his albums feature collaborations with vocalists Singh Kaur, Stephannie and Wendy Rule.

Stadler's third album, Fairy Heartmagic was listed on Billboard's New Age Top 25 chart for four weeks in year 2000.  Several of his songs have been featured on compilations on multiple record labels in the USA and Europe.

Stadler is the brother of professional golfer Craig Stadler.

Background and artistic development

Stadler knew at an early age that music would play a major role in his life. In school, in his hometown of San Diego, he learned to play the piano and most of the other instruments in the orchestra. When asked what he wanted to be when he grew up, he always replied, "I want to be an orchestra conductor!"

In 1993 he wrote two songs, "Dream Spell" and "Awakening", for a play produced and performed in San Diego entitled The Goblin's Bride, based on Celtic myths of the realm of Faerie.  Those songs were the genesis of his first album, Fairy of the Woods,  released by Sequoia Records in 1996, and well received by the alternative market of independent New Age bookstores.

Stadler found a loyal audience who stayed with him as he added vocals and moved into a more acoustic direction on his second album released in 1998, Fairy NightSongs, featuring the lyrics and exquisite voice of recording artist Singh Kaur, already known to New Age listeners for her Crimson Series of  recordings featuring harpist Kim Robertson.

For his third record, Stadler collaborated with Stephannie, a young vocalist and songwriter with a unique talent — by recalling her dreams she composed lyrics in a form of glossolalia she referred to as a new language of Celtic fantasy. Joined by the well-known Celtic harpist Lisa Lynne, Stadler's third album, Fairy HeartMagic,  was released on Sequoia Records in October 2000, recognized on Billboard's New Age Top 25. The song Fairy NightSongs from this album was awarded JPF Best New Age/World song of 2004 following its appearance on a compilation. This was the first of Stadler's CD to be enhanced with a CD-ROM session that offers two bonus songs in MP3 format and additional artwork for computer display.  All of Stadler's later albums featured similar enhancements.

Stadler's fourth album, Reflections of Faerie, in 2003 returned to instrumental pieces reminiscent of his first release but with a deeper and more intimate feel, mostly solo piano, with some featured harp artistry of Lisa Lynne.   In 2004, for his fifth release Deep Within a Faerie Forest, Stadler collaborated with singer/composer Wendy Rule of Australia. This recording once again delves deep into the depths of the mystical Faerie realms with intriguing lyrics and unusual instrumentation.  His sixth album, Faerie Lullabies was a retrospective produced in 2006 in which he chose the most peaceful and comforting pieces from his earlier releases and re-recorded them in the form of instrumental lullabies, intended for both children and their parents.

Stadler's song "Fairy of the Woods" was featured on the sound track of A Magickal Life: Jeff McBride, produced and broadcast by Canada's VisionTV, a one-hour episode of their series Enigma True-Life Stories in January 2006.  His former wife Tamara contributed lyrics to his albums as well as the albums of fellow Vegas Vortex musical group Zingaia, also featured in the same documentary program.

Album artwork

The artwork on the first two of  Stadler's six albums was created by San Diego artist Scott Thom, known for his original airbrush paintings coveted by collectors and his line of New Age greeting cards. Las Vegas artist Katlyn Breene of Zingaia (who also wrote some of the lyrics on Fairy NightSongs and Fairy HeartMagic) created the artwork for Stadler's remaining albums.

Broad interests

In addition to his musical talents, Stadler's interests and skills are widely varied.  He has spent the majority of his business life as an electronics design engineer with emphasis on laser system design.  His love for automobile mechanics won him 1st place in the San Diego Plymouth Troubleshooting contest, continuing on to win 4th place in the national Plymouth Troubleshooting contest.  His interests include technical and historical glassblowing — he currently specializes in the manufacture of distillation equipment for essential oils.  He is known for his expertise in stage lighting and laser art (one of his first careers), producing "wet" light shows and laser light shows in the 1970s and 1980s, owning and operating an electronic design/manufacturing company from the mid-1970s through the late 1990s, and winning a Technical Achievement Oscar for innovations in the film lighting industry in 1994. More recently, he has used these skills in the creation of innovative temporary art installations at the Burning Man festivals, events produced by the Vegas Vortex, and stage magic productions of Jeff McBride.

Discography

Solo instrumental albums

 Fairy of the Woods  (1996, Sequoia Records)
 Reflections of Faerie (2003, Sequoia Records)
 Faerie Lullabies (2006, Sequoia Records)

Album collaborations with vocalists

 Fairy NightSongs  with Singh Kaur (1998, Sequoia Records)
 Fairy HeartMagic with Stephannie (2000, Sequoia Records)
 Deep within a Faerie Forest  with Wendy Rule (2005, Sequoia Records)

Album producer

 This Universe by  Singh Kaur (2005, Sequoia Records)

Compilations including recordings by Gary Stadler

 Musical Healing (2001, Sequoia Records)
 Mystic Celtic (2002, BSC Music GmbH)
 Buddha-Lounge (2002, Sequoia Records)
 Qi Gong (2003, BSC Music GmbH)
 Celticum Mysticum (2004, Prudence Recordings)
 Perfect Balance, Musical Healing Vol 2 (2005, Sequoia Records)
 Celtic Lounge (2005, Sequoia Records)
 Celtic Lounge II (2007, Sequoia Records)

References

External links
[ Gary Stadler on Allmusic]
Gary Stadler artist website
Gary Stadler's HeartMagic Essential Oil Distillers
Alternate website for Gary Stadler's Essential Oil Distillation Equipment
Gary Stadler Discography on Sequoia Records

New-age musicians
Living people
Year of birth missing (living people)
Academy Award for Technical Achievement winners